Saurania, or Sauronisena, or Saunaria (Σαυναρία), was a town of ancient Pontus, inhabited during Roman and Byzantine times. It was in the later province of Pontus Polemoniacus, and mentioned by Ptolemy.

Its site is tentatively located near Gölköy in Asiatic Turkey.

References

Populated places in ancient Pontus
Former populated places in Turkey
Roman towns and cities in Turkey
Populated places of the Byzantine Empire
History of Ordu Province